Brachystegia nigerica is a species of plant in the family Fabaceae. It is found in Cameroon and Nigeria. It is threatened by habitat loss.

References

nigerica
Flora of Cameroon
Flora of Nigeria
Trees of Africa
Vulnerable flora of Africa
Taxa named by William Evans Hoyle
Taxonomy articles created by Polbot